Rodeo Girl (2016) is a feature-length film starring Kevin Sorbo, Sophie Bolen, and Derek Brandon. It follows the story of a young girl and her horse as they transition from English style riding to barrel racing. The film was produced by Joel Paul Reisig, Lucas Miles, and Brian Harrington and distributed by Vertical Entertainment.

References

External links 
 
 

2016 films
Films about horses
Vertical Entertainment films
American horse racing films
2010s American films